Maddison Bird (born April 19, 1994) is a Canadian pair skater. With partner Raymond Schultz, she finished sixth at the 2009 World Junior Championships and won the junior bronze medal at the 2009 Canadian Championships. Their partnership ended in 2010.

Programs 
(with Schultz)

Competitive highlights 
(with Schultz)

References

External links 
 
 Maddison Bird

1994 births
Canadian female pair skaters
Living people
Sportspeople from Barrie
Sportspeople from Scarborough, Toronto